Tumaini Steede (28 April 1990 – 11 July 2012) was a Bermudian footballer who played as a striker.

Career
Steede played club football for Devonshire Cougars. In 2011 he won the Bermuda Football Association Young Player of the Year award.

He earned two senior caps for the Bermuda national team, representing them at the 2007 Island Games. He also made 3 appearances for Bermuda under-20s during 2009 CONCACAF U-20 Championship qualifying.

Death
Steede was involved in a motorcycle collision on 2 July 2012, and died from his injuries on 11 July 2012.

References

1990 births
2012 deaths
Bermudian footballers
Bermuda international footballers
Bermuda under-20 international footballers
Devonshire Cougars players
Association football forwards
Road incident deaths in Bermuda